Cetywa Powell is an American photographer and filmmaker. She also ran the independent book publishing company,  Underground Voices. She has a bachelor's degree in chemistry from Columbia University.

Filmography

Photography
In 2017, Powell contributed photos to the California Today section of the New York Times.

 Newspapers: The New York Times
 Museums: Museum of Flight, Seattle (2018 Exhibition, 2021 Exhibition); Grants Pass Museum of Art, Oregon (2022)
 Magazines: About Town Magazine, San Diego, Winter 2017/2018 issue - Cover photo; Seeing in Sixes Magazine by LensWork (2017); Monovisions B&W photography magazine (2016); Shadow & Light magazine (2016, 2018)
 Select Awards/Recognitions: 2020 London International Creative Competition; 2019 Fine Art Photography Awards, 2018 Moscow Foto Awards, Honorable Mention; 2017 MonoVisions Photography Awards, Honorable Mention; 2016 International Photography Awards, Honorable Mention; 2016 ND Photography Awards, Honorable Mention; 2016 Shoot The Frame Portrait finalist; 2015 International Photography Awards, Honorable Mention; 2013 National Geographic, Daily Dozen selection;
 Exhibitions: Hanoi, Vietnam (2021); Athens, Greece (2021); London (2018); New York (2017); CA 101 - Redondo Beach, CA (2017); Texas (2015); Vermont (2015) Trieste Airport, Italy (2015); Florida (2014); Hungary (2014); Maryland (2014);  Virginia (2014); France (2013-2014)
 Official photography site, Ten8Photography

Books
Author:
Dirty Hands screenplay  (2016; paperback 978–0990433187)

Editor:
Red Moon District (2013; paperback 978–0983045663)
From the UV Files (2012; paperback 978–0983045632) 
Hotel Oblivion (2011; paperback 978–0983045625)
Last Train To Noir City (2010; paperback 978-0-9830456-0-1)
Chewing the Fat (2009; paperback 978–0615314754)

External links
Interview, Entropy magazine, Nov 22, 2016
 Interview, indieWIRE, February 1, 2006

References

American film directors
American screenwriters
Columbia College (New York) alumni
Year of birth missing (living people)
Living people
Fine art photographers